Warminster School is a co-educational independent boarding and day school in Warminster, Wiltshire, England, for pupils aged three to eighteen. Initially established in 1707, the school took its current form in 1973 with the amalgamation of Lord Weymouth's Grammar School and St Monica's. It now comprises the Preparatory School, for pupils aged three to eleven, and the Senior School for students aged eleven to eighteen.

The school's buildings lie in grounds which face open country on the edge of Warminster town centre. The Preparatory School is on a neighbouring site.

Founding and amalgamations

In 1707, Thomas Thynne, 1st Viscount Weymouth, under the influence of Bishop Thomas Ken (1637–1711), founded a grammar school for boys in the market town of Warminster, near to his family seat of Longleat, to instruct the boys of Warminster, Longbridge Deverill, and Monkton Deverill in Latin, mathematics, and other subjects of the usual syllabus of the day. This became known as Lord Weymouth's Grammar School – referred to locally as the "Latin School" – and by the 20th century was called The Lord Weymouth School.

Lord Weymouth (1640–1714) was descended from the first Sir John Thynne of Longleat House. In 1673 he married Lady Francis Finch, a daughter of the Earl of Winchelsea, and lived at Drayton Basset, near Tamworth. He was Member of Parliament for the University of Oxford (1674–1679), and High Steward of Tamworth in 1679. In 1680 he was created Baron Thynne and in 1682 Viscount Weymouth. He was High Steward of the Royal Town of Sutton Coldfield from 1679 to 1714. His three sons all predeceased him.

While the history of Lord Weymouth's School goes back to 1707, the school in its current form was created in 1973 by the merger of Lord Weymouth's, a boys' school, and the girls' school St Monica's, which had been founded in 1874 by the nuns of the St Denys Retreat.  The present-day school also occupies some buildings once used by the former St Boniface Missionary College and the St Denys Convent and retreat.

In 2007 the school celebrated the tercentenary of the founding of Lord Weymouth's Grammar School with a series of events, including a Service of Thanksgiving in Salisbury Cathedral, at which the Bishop of Salisbury spoke about the school's history, and with a Royal Visit when Prince Edward, Earl of Wessex, opened the new Wessex Science Centre.

History of buildings

St Boniface

Now a major element of the School's estate, housing boarding accommodation and offices, St Boniface House started life as an Anglican missionary college founded by the energetic vicar of Warminster, the Rev. James Erasmus Philipps, whose family was interested in missionary work. The original intention was to train boys and young men who had little previous education but were capable of becoming good workers. Later on the aim was to train them for entry into missionary colleges, both at home and overseas. The Mission House was formally opened in a house near the parish church on 5 October 1860, with eleven students. By 1871 the range of education offered had grown considerably and as the result of a lead seal being dug up in a nearby garden bearing the name of Pope Boniface, the house's name was changed to St Boniface College. In the same year the students built a corrugated iron chapel, which later students enlarged in 1909, in use until 1936. In 1890 the students built themselves a cricket pavilion and established a printing press, on which they were publishing a college magazine in 1896.

In 1897 the foundation stone of new permanent buildings was laid on the north side of the house. The first block of these buildings was opened on 1 August 1899, and they were completed by 1901. They are built in the neo-Jacobean style of Doulting stone, with Bath stone dressings. Student numbers grew; in 1908 there were 40 and this later rose to 53. In 1913, after the death of Philipps, the constitution of the College was changed and one of the purposes now listed was for the actual training of missionaries. The College closed during the First World War but then re-opened and flourished. In 1927, a large extension to the south, designed by Sir Charles Nicholson, added a chapel and library. The College again closed for the duration of the Second World War.

The college had a reputation of being a caring house with mutual respect and trust between its occupants, aiming to develop this respect and maturity so that pupils were well prepared for their future. In 1943, J. W. Tomlin, the former Principal of the College, wrote of St Boniface that, even if it should be called upon to fulfil a different role in the future, it may well be that "the latter glory of the house shall be greater than the former". When the college re-opened in 1948 it was associated with King's College, London, as a post-graduate training centre for missionary work. The numbers expanded to 57 students and a staff of three priests. In 1969 the course was moved from Warminster to Canterbury and the College closed. The St Boniface Trust was established and has leased the buildings and land to Warminster School ever since.

St Monica and St Denys
The Rev. J. E. Philipps also founded the Community of St Denys; in addition to training women for work abroad, in 1890 the Anglican nuns of the community established St Monica's School for Girls, and until 1959 also ran the Orphanage of Pity. In September 1996, the St Denys building re-opened as a boarding house of Warminster School, for senior boys from Year 9 to the Upper Sixth. In September 2020, the school started a new diamond boarding system. St Denys was renamed St Monica's and is now the junior (Year 3 to Year 8) mixed boarding house.

Preparatory School
Warminster Preparatory School takes children from three to eleven years old and shares grounds and facilities with the senior school, which is for the age range eleven to eighteen.  More than half the school is involved in music and about 120 pupils learn an instrument. A large number is engaged in dramatic activities.

In media 
In 2015, the school was featured in the ITV documentary School Swap: The Class Divide. The two-part documentary featured Jo Ward, (headteacher of the state-funded Bemrose School, Derby) and three pupils undertaking an exchange with pupils at Warminster School to explore the differences between state and private education.

Notable Old Verlucians

Former pupils of Lord Weymouth's School, St. Monica's and Warminster School, are called Old Verlucians. After over three hundred years, the school can claim many notable OVs, among whom are:

Thomas Arnold, innovative educator, Head Master of Rugby School from 1828 to 1842 immortalised in Tom Brown's Schooldays, renowned for developing the model followed by most public schools, was educated at Warminster from 1803 to 1807.
Guy Boothby, Australian writer, who in 1890 wrote the libretto for a comic opera, Sylvia, which was published and produced at Adelaide in December 1890, and in 1891 appeared The Jonquil: an Opera.
Freddie Bartholomew, an English child actor, popular in 1930s Hollywood films such as Anna Karenina (1935) with Greta Garbo, Professional Soldier (1935) with Gloria Stuart, Little Lord Fauntleroy (1936) with Dolores Costello, Lloyd's of London (1937) with Madeleine Carroll and Tyrone Power, and Captains Courageous (1937) with Spencer Tracy.
Christina Chan, Hong Kong political activist, became known during the Olympics torch relay in Hong Kong where she held the Tibetan snow lion flag, and engaged in a confrontation with the pro-Beijing camp. She was forcibly removed by the Hong Kong Police Force, who claimed it was for her protection.

James Ingram (1774–1850), an Oxford don originally from Codford St Mary, was Rawlinsonian Professor of Anglo-Saxon from 1803 to 1808 and President of Trinity College, Oxford, from 1824 to 1850.
Frederick Jaeger (1928–2004), a German-born actor, is remembered inter alia by fans of the science fiction series Doctor Who for his roles in three serials – The Savages in 1966, Planet of Evil in 1975 and The Invisible Enemy in 1977.
Samuel Squire, Bishop of St Davids.
James Vince, Hampshire and England cricketer.
A B Walkley, drama critic of The Times from 1900 to 1926.
Robert Walter, Conservative Member of Parliament from 1997 to 2015. He has also served as Chairman of the Defence Committee of the European Security and Defence Assembly, established under the Treaty of the Western European Union.
Tyrone Urch, British Army officer - Lieutenant General and Commander Home Command (2018)

Houses
The pupils of Warminster School are split between four competitive 'houses' across all ages and boarding houses; Arnold, Denys, Finch, Ken.

Arnold; named after Thomas Arnold, an Old Verlucian of considerable note: an educator and historian, and an early supporter of the broad church Anglican movement. His appointment to the headship of the renowned Rugby School in 1828, after some years as a tutor, turned the school's fortunes around, and his force of character and religious zeal enabled him to turn it into a model followed by the other public schools, exercising an unprecedented influence on the educational system of the country. He is portrayed as a leading character in the novel Tom Brown's Schooldays.
Denys; named after the order established by Rev. Philipps which led to the creation of St. Monica's School for Girls and St. Denys House. St Denys (Denis) is a Christian martyr and saint. In the third century, he was Bishop of Paris. He was martyred in approximately A.D. 250, and is venerated in the Roman Catholic Church as patron of Paris, and as one of the Fourteen Holy Helpers. Denis, having alarmed the pagan priests by his many conversions, was executed by beheading on the highest hill in Paris (now Montmartre).
Ken; named after Thomas Ken, Bishop of Bath and Wells, who was considered the most eminent of the English non-juring bishops, and one of the fathers of modern English hymnology. He was influential in the founding of Lord Weymouth's School when, in retirement, he found a congenial home with Thomas Thynne, 1st Viscount Weymouth, his friend from college days, at Longleat in Wiltshire. He died there on 19 March 1711, only four years after helping found the school. He was buried at the Church of St John the Baptist, Frome where his crypt can still be seen. He is remembered in the Church of England with a Lesser Festival on 8 June, and is honoured with a feast day in the liturgical calendar of the Episcopal Church on 20 March.
Finch; named after Frances Finch, the wife of Thomas Thynne, 1st Viscount Weymouth, the school’s founder. She was the daughter of Heneage Finch, 3rd Earl of Winchilsea. Finch house was established by the school in 2020.

Warminster Fives

Behind School House stands a fives court, built in 1860. One source states that Lord Weymouth's school had a court before 1787. Fives has some similarities to squash: the court is similar in size but has a stone floor. No racket is required, only a pair of padded gloves. The rules for Warminster Fives are documented by the Eton Fives Association.

Warminster Fives is likely to be the same game as Wessex Fives, which originated some centuries ago, when men and boys sometimes used the buttresses and walls of a church and hit the ball with their hands against the walls – the angles of the buttresses and walls lending variety to the game. Several versions of fives were developed, the most common today being Eton Fives.

List of Headmasters

References

External links
 
 Inspection reports by the Independent Schools Inspectorate
 UK Boarding Schools guide

Educational institutions established in 1973
Private schools in Wiltshire
International Baccalaureate schools in England
Member schools of the Headmasters' and Headmistresses' Conference
Church of England private schools in the Diocese of Salisbury
Warminster